The Șasa (also: Sașa) is a left tributary of the river Olteț in Romania. It discharges into the Olteț in Gănești. It flows through the communes Roșiile and Tetoiu.

References

Rivers of Romania
Rivers of Vâlcea County